Slimani is an Arabic family name based on the given name Suleiman (Solomon). Slimani is a transliteration of localized slang pronunciation, whereas in classic Arabic, it would be pronounced as Suleimani.

Notable people with the surname include:

Bilel Slimani (born 1989), an Algerian football player for Paradou AC
Chico Slimani (born 1971), a Welsh singer of Moroccan descent, who took part in 2005 in UK's The X factor
Islam Slimani (born 1988), an Algerian football player for Leicester City and for Algeria
Leïla Slimani, French-Moroccan journalist and author